Fajr Rural District is a rural district (dehestan) in the Central District of Gonbad-e Qabus County, Golestan Province, Iran. At the 2006 census, its population was 40,672, in 8,932 families.  The rural district has 30 villages.

References 

Rural Districts of Golestan Province
Gonbad-e Kavus County